The Red–Green Alliance or Unity List (EL) is an eco-socialist political party in Denmark. It was founded in 1989 with the merger of three Marxist parties and it is the furthest left-wing party in the Danish parliament, where it advocates for an expansion of welfare and social justice as well as socialist transformation in Denmark and internationally. During the 2021 Danish municipal elections the party placed first in the Danish capital Copenhagen, with 24.6% of the votes. The party is also active in various Danish trade unions.

Political and ideological position 
The party describes itself as a socialist and democratic grassroots party, which claims also to represent green politics, peace movement, anti-discrimination, and trade union movement. The party's ideological position is set out in a manifesto from 2014. It proposes that a socialistic society of the future "neither can nor should be described in detail, but rather be developed and shaped by the people living in it". It describes socialism as "an answer to the problems caused by capitalism such as non-sufficient democracy, crises, destruction of nature, inequality, racism and war".

Holding anti-capitalist and soft Eurosceptic views, about the economic system it says:
A new and actually democratic system of society requires fundamental changes in the ownership of the means of production, such as companies, land and natural resources. Collective forms of ownership will be dominating. We propose that public authorities, co-workers, local communities and other collectives of persons should own and run institutions and companies. ... A democratic economy means a democratic work life as well. The work place should be characterized by democracy, and the employees must have a constitutional right to decisive influence on the organization of work in the workplace.

The Red–Green Alliance recognizes that methods achieving this may differ depending on the course of class struggle, but will eventually require a revolution—one that must be supported by a majority of the population manifested through democratic and free elections. The party often adopts particular views in relation to the other parties in the Folketing and opt out of many of the settlements reached, seen as an expression of class collaboration. Until the conditions for the party's long-term goal are presented, the party will use its seats in parliament to vote for any improvement and against any deterioration of working-class people's lives. In line with this, the party agreed at its national conference in 2010 that if Helle Thorning-Schmidt became Prime Minister after the 2011 election, the party would vote for a "red" budget bill that did not contain obvious flaws.

Policies

Social policy 
The party places great emphasis on the fight against social inequality and poverty, and is in favour of strengthening and expanding the welfare state. The party believes there is place in society for all forms of diversity, including gender, sexuality, disability and ethnic background. It also advocates for a larger public sector, among other things, to improve quality of life for public sector employees.

The party believes people should be free to choose when they want to get an education and is opposed to tuition fees, which they believe harm opportunities for everyone to acquire an education. The party does not see unemployment as being equal to laziness and seeks to abolish the Danish equivalent of workfare.

Economic policy 
The party is decisively anti-capitalist and has particularly distinguished itself as an opponent of transfer pricing, whereby multinational companies minimise the amount they pay in tax by attributing their profits to countries with lower tax rates.

In response to the Great Recession, the Red–Green Alliance urged stricter control of loans, the introduction of a Tobin tax, and the nationalisation of banks and mortgage companies. It also believes that the public sector must be expanded, the wages of the lowest-paid workers should be raised, and the insurance-based unemployment benefit period should be extended to a minimum of four years. At the same time, students should be given a greater state education grant. At minimum, all benefits should be raised to 13,500 kroner per month before taxes.

Foreign policy 
The party advocates for foreign policy based on respect for human rights, which it believes has not been appropriately prioritised in the past. It also proposes greater support for developing countries through a doubling of foreign aid, and campaigns for Denmark's withdrawal from NATO. In March 2019, the party announced it would no longer campaign for a referendum to leave the EU, pointing to Brexit illustrating the need for clarity before withdrawal can be considered.

The party operates on the fundamental belief that peace is preferable to war, and has been opposed from the beginning to Denmark's participation in the wars in Iraq and Afghanistan. That principle was challenged in 2011, when the party's parliamentary group voted in favour of Danish participation in the UN-sanctioned military action in Libya on the basis that it was a humanitarian action. However, the decision led to significant backlash, and the party's support was pulled back after the military intervention began.

History 

The party was formed in 1989 as an electoral alliance of three left-wing parties: Left Socialists (VS), Communist Party of Denmark (DKP), and Socialist Workers Party (SAP). Originally the plan was to unite these parties alongside The Greens (De Grønne), Common Course, and Humanist to form a broad-based progressive movement, but this did not materialize. A fourth party, the Communist Workers Party (KAP), succeeded in joining the alliance in 1991, but its involvement was vetoed a year later by DKP.

Prior to the 2007 parliamentary election, the party enlisted Asmaa Abdol-Hamid, a Danish Muslim candidate who identified herself as a feminist, democrat, and socialist. She is endorsed by some imams, opposed by others (including those in Hizb-ut-Tahrir), wears a hijab and will not shake hands with men. These facts, and some of her statements regarding politics and religion, made her the target of some criticism across the political spectrum, particularly from the Danish People's Party. Some left-wing figures cited her candidacy as a reason for withdrawing their support from the party. An anti-religious network was created within the party with the stated goal of turning the party into a solely atheist party with a materialist–Marxist basis.

During the campaign, there was some speculation as to whether her candidacy would attract or repel voters. The results of the election were 2.2% for the party, down from 3.4% in the 2005 parliamentary elections. Although not elected, Abdol-Hamid maintained that she had attracted voters to the party. The four seats won by the party went to Frank Aaen, Johanne Schmidt-Nielsen, Line Barfod, and Per Clausen.

In the 2011 parliamentary election, the party received 6.7% of the vote and tripled its representation from 4 seats to 12 seats.

The party contested the 2013 local elections on a platform of improving public transport and making greater public investment.

As part of the left-leaning "Red bloc" coalition with the Social Democrats, the Red–Green Alliance accepted the state budget twice and was in opposition twice in the period from 2011 to 2015. But at no point did they report direct opposition to the government. In the 2015 general election, the party received 7.8% of the vote and increased its representation from 12 seats to 14 seats.

Electoral performance

Parliament

The distribution of Red–Green Alliance's voters is geographically disparate. While in Nørrebro and Vesterbro districts of Copenhagen, it was the strongest party in the 2015 election, scoring 26.5 and 20.8% respectively (in Bispebjerg it received 22%, placing it only slightly behind the Social Democrats), the party is much more weakly positioned in rural parts of Denmark, taking only an average of 4.5% of votes in Western Jutland with as little as 3.1% in the Ringkøbing district.

Local elections

European Parliament
Prior to 2016, the Red–Green Alliance never directly contested elections to the European Parliament, preferring to support the People's Movement against the EU, a Eurosceptic party whose MEP sits in the European United Left–Nordic Green Left group. Some of the party's MPs were considering running an independent list for the 2014 elections, but this idea was dismissed by a majority on the party's yearly meeting.

In a historic decision in the party's yearly meeting in May 2016, a majority decided to directly contest the 2019 European Parliament election.

Membership

Elected representatives

2022 Danish general election 

 Jette Gottlieb
 Peder Hvelplund 
 Rosa Lund
 Søren Egge Rasmussen
 Søren Søndergaard
 Victoria Velasquez
 Mai Villadsen
 Pelle Dragsted
 Trine Mach

See also 
 Politics of Denmark
 Johanne Schmidt-Nielsen

References

External links 
  Official website
  Official website

1989 establishments in Denmark
Ecosocialist parties
Political parties established in 1989
Party of the European Left member parties
Socialist parties in Denmark
Eurosceptic parties in Denmark
Anti-capitalist political parties
Green political parties in Denmark